The New York State Fallen Firefighters Memorial in Albany, New York is dedicated to the New York firefighters who have died in the line of duty. Governor of New York George Pataki officially dedicated the memorial on October 5, 1998. The sculpture rests on a paved plaza with charcoal and red bricks forming a Maltese Cross. The Memorial stands on the northeast side of the Empire State Plaza in the park-like area bordered by Norway maples. It is easily accessible to the hundreds of thousand of visitors who travel to the New York State Capitol and Plaza each year.

The Fallen Firefighters Memorial Ceremony is held each year during national Fire Prevention Week.

See also
 List of firefighting monuments and memorials
National Fallen Firefighters Memorial
IAFF Fallen Fire Fighters Memorial

External links

New York State Fallen Firefighters Monument
New York State Firefighters Online Memorial
NYS Fallen Firefighters Memorial Ceremony 10/10/06

1998 sculptures
Buildings and structures in Albany, New York
Buildings and structures completed in 1998
Bronze sculptures in New York (state)
Empire State Plaza
Firefighting memorials
Firefighting in New York (state)
Monuments and memorials in New York (state)
Statues in New York (state)